Jussi Award for Best Actor is an award presented annually at the Jussi Awards, the premier film industry event in Finland. The 1st Jussi Awards ceremony was held in 1944, with Joel Rinne winning the first Jussi Award for Best Actor for his performance in Kirkastettu sydän.

Winners

Multiple awards

3 awards
Tommi Korpela (2 consecutive)
Tauno Palo
Lasse Pöysti

2 awards
Eero Aho
Hannu-Pekka Björkman
Martti Kainulainen
Hannu Lauri
Vesa-Matti Loiri
Paavo Pentikäinen
Joel Rinne
Martti Suosalo
Rauli Tuomi

References

External links
 
 Jussi Awards on the Internet Movie Database

Actor
Film awards for lead actor